Michele Smith is an American actress and model, most commonly known as the hostess on the TV series American Thunder. She has also been featured in magazines including Playboy, Muscle and Fitness, Swimwear USA, Swimwear International, Neue Revue, Wild Motorcycles, Full Throttle, V-Twin, Hot Rod, Easyriders, and Iron Works. In addition to modeling, she designs women's clothing and lingerie, especially for the motorcycle market.

Filmography

References

External links
 
 

American actresses
American female models
American television personalities
American women television personalities
Living people
Place of birth missing (living people)
Year of birth missing (living people)
21st-century American actresses